Petey Scalzo (1917-1993) was an American boxer from Hell's Kitchen, New York. He was declared the National Boxing Association Featherweight Championship of the World on May 1, 1940, two weeks prior to winning a sixth-round technical knockout over Frankie Covelli on May 15, 1940.  The NBA had withdrawn the world featherweight championship from Joey Archibald the previous month for his refusal to fight leading contenders, including Scalzo.

Scalzo's manager was the hard working Pete Reilly who found monthly bouts for Scalzo as he began to rise in the boxing ranks.  His trainers were Dan and Nick Florio.

Early life and career
Scazo was born in Brooklyn, New York on August 1, 1917, to an Italian family, and survived a rough childhood in Hell’s Kitchen. To earn a living as a youth, he sold newspapers, and danced on street corners for small donations from passing pedestrians. According to one source he spoke Italian, Greek, and sign language as a young man.

Showing remarkable talent in his pursuit of boxing as an amateur, he took the New York Metropolitan AAU championship, and International Golden Gloves bantamweight championship.  At the end of his amateur career in 1936, he won the New York Daily News Golden Gloves Open Bantamweight 118 pound Championship before a crowd of 20,000, and soon decided to turn professional.

Important win over NYSAC featherweight champion Joey Archibald, 1938
On December 5, 1938, Scalzo defeated the reigning New York State Athletic Commission's (NYSAC) world featherweight champion Joey Archibald in a second-round knockout at Royal Windsor Arena in New York.  The bout was not a title fight, and certainly not recognized as one by the National Boxing Association (NBA), a sanctioning body with a wider range and more prestige than the NYSAC.  In the first round, Archibald received a hard right to the chin, but managed to rally to keep the round even.  After finding an opening in the second round, Scalzo delivered three powerful right hooks to the chin of Archibald that dropped him 2 minutes, and 10 seconds after the bell. The win would cement Scalzo as the leading contender for the National Boxing Association's world featherweight championship.

Demonstrating his punching ability, Scalzo defeated Lou Transparenti at Turners Arena in Washington in a seventh-round technical knockout on January 3, 1939.

On December 1, 1939, Scalzo defeated Allie Stoltz in a fourth-round knockout at New York's Madison Square Garden.  It was Stoltz's first loss by knockout.  In the fourth, Scalzo knocked Stoltz to the mat for a count of seven with a strong left hook to the chin.  Upon arising he was knocked to the mat again with a straight right, after which the referee ended the bout when Stolz could not rise to his feet.

Taking the NBA world featherweight championship, May 1940
On May 15, 1940, Scalzo defeated Frankie Covelli for the National Boxing Association (NBA) World featherweight title at Washington D.C.'s Griffith Stadium in a decisive sixth-round TKO.  Scalzo had previously been declared world featherweight champion by the NBA on May 1, 1940. Scalzo first dropped Covelli to the mat in the fifth with a left hook during close infighting that required Covelli to take a count of nine before he could rise to resume the bout.  Upon arising, Scalzo knocked Covelli to the mat again, and after he resumed the bout, Scalzo dropped him for the third and final time.  The win was probably Scalzo's single most important victory.

He followed his victory over Covelli with a decisive eight round points decision over Mike Belloise before a roaring crowd of 900 at Starlight Park in the Bronx on June 3, 1940.  Belloise briefly held the NYSAC world featherweight title in 1936 before being stripped of it in August, 1937.

Notable bouts during world featherweight title reign
On July 10, 1940, in one of his few defenses of the world featherweight title, Scalzo defeated Bobby "Poison" Ivy in a fifteen-round TKO in Hartford, Connecticut. Scalzo showed superiority in both long range boxing and infighting, though in the twelfth, Ivy staged a comeback which brought the Connecticut crowd of 5,000 to their feet. Ivy did not return to the ring as the bell sounded for the fifteenth round due to a badly cut and bleeding lip.  The United Press scoreboard gave Scalzo eleven rounds, with the second and twelfth for Ivy, and one tied.  A few officials present felt Ivy deserved the eleventh round as well.

On July 15, 1940, Scalzo defeated Maxie Fisher before a crowd of around 5600 in a ten-round points decision at Meadowbrook Bowl in Newark, New Jersey.  Scalzo was five years younger and had boxed professionally six fewer years.  His youthfulness allowed him to step up the contest in the final five rounds.  Fisher could not keep pace as Scalzo bored in and delivered a variety of blows, particularly his close range left hook.  Nonetheless, there were no knockdowns, and Fisher rallied at times to keep the crowd interested.

On August 26, 1940, Scalzo defeated Jimmy Perrin in a well publicized ten round unanimous decision which brought 10,000 fans to City Park Stadium in New Orleans. Perrin, who fought defensively throughout the bout, was "completely outclassed" by the hard punching Scalzo, and took only the ninth round. Though Scalzo dominated, the fight had no knockdowns and neither boxer left the bout with visible injuries.  As both boxers were over the featherweight limit, there was no title at stake.

In an unexpected loss, on October 4, 1940, Jewish boxer Julie Kogon defeated Scalzo in a non-title eight round points decision at Madison Square Garden.  Scalzo was down in both the sixth and seventh rounds.  Though both fighters fought under 131 pounds, very close to the featherweight range, Kogon was never recognized as a world featherweight championship, as he was a pound or two overweight.

In a non-title bout on November 1, 1940, Scalzo defeated Bernie Friedkin, a Jewish boxer from Brooklyn, at New York's Madison Square Garden in an eight-round points decision, though the New York Times reported the decision was not well received by the fans who were rooting for Friedkin.

On April 18, 1941, he won a first-round technical knockout against Andy Strivani at Legion Stadium in Hollywood, flooring him four times in the first round with rousing rights to the head.  After 1:25 of the first around, the referee called the fight.

Title match draw with Phil Zwick, May 19, 1941
Scalzo fought Phil Zwick for the National Boxing Association World featherweight title on May 19, 1941, in a Milwaukee, Wisconsin bout that was eventually declared a draw after it was discovered referee Barney Ross had changed his initial scoring from a draw to a Scalzo win.  Ross may have been inexperienced as a referee, as his real fame was as a former world light and welterweight champion.

Losing the NBA world featherweight championship to Richie Lemos, July, 1941
On July 1, 1941 Scalzo lost the NBA world featherweight title before a near capacity crowd of 9,500 to Richie Lemos in a fifth-round knockout of a 12-round bout at the Olympic Auditorium in Los Angeles.  Scalzo claimed that he had been somewhat weak during practice the weeks before, having trouble making weight.  He was briefly down in the first for a no count from a left by Lemos, who appeared to take the first two rounds.  The third and fourth appeared to belong to Scalzo, however, who landed effective uppercuts and crossing rights to Lemos, who rarely countered.  In the fifth round, Lemos changed to his natural right hand forward with left foot back or southpaw stance, and in an instant landed a vicious left to the head of Scalzo that changed the course of the bout.  Lemos then chased Scalzo to a corner, delivering more punishment.  When Scalzo tried to retreat, Lemos tagged him with another scorching left that put his crumpled opponent on the mat for a nine count. According to one source, Lemos had used a feint with his right to throw Scalzo off balance prior to delivering his scorching left.  As Scalzo gamely rose and made a futile attempt to resume the fight for the last time, Lemos dropped him for an eight count.  Scalzo struggled to rise without success, and the referee called the bout.

Loss against reigning NYSAC world lightweight champion Bob Montgomery, October 1943
Scalzo's last publicized fight was against reigning NYSAC  and Pennsylvania lightweight champion Bob Montgomery on October 25, 1943 at Convention Hall in Philadelphia.  No title was at stake as both men were over the lightweight limit, with Montgomery at 137 and Scalzo at 138.  In 1970 he played "Dinty the Dope" in Starlite Film's poorly reviewed Cauliflower Cupids appearing once again with ex-champions LaMotta and Graziano.

Scalzo died in New York on June 15, 1993, at 73. His wife Christina died a few years earlier.  He spent several years in a Veteran's Hospital, suffering from Alzheimers prior to his death.

Primary boxing achievements

|-

|-

External links
 http://www.boxrec.com/media/index.php?title=Human:25527
 http://www.boxrec.com/list_bouts.php?human_id=25527&cat=boxer

References 

1917 births
1993 deaths
Sportspeople from Brooklyn
Boxers from New York City
Featherweight boxers
World boxing champions
World featherweight boxing champions
American people of Italian descent
American male boxers